Brujas F.C. was a Costa Rican football club, based in Desamparados, Costa Rica.

The name Brujas translates to Witches. The team's home town used to be Escazú, known around the country as "La ciudad de las Brujas" or "The Witches' Town", but the franchise later transferred to Desamparados. The team was dissolved in July 2011.

History

A.D. Guanacasteca
The club was founded in 2004 as Brujas de Escazú when they took over the Asociación Deportiva Guanacasteca (A.D. Guanacasteca or ADG) licence to play in the Primera División de Costa Rica. Guanacasteca, known as Los Pamperos, were founded on 3 March 1973 as Nicoya F.C. but were renamed when they made their debut in the second division in 1974; they were once more renamed Sociedad Deportiva Guanacasteca in 2001. Guanacasteca were crowned Second Division champions 4 times, in 1975, 1985, 1995 and 2002.In 2005, ADG was reestablished after buying Ciudad Colón second division franchise.

Brujas de Escazú
The newly founded team was subsequently moved from Nicoya, where they played at the Estadio Chorotega, in Guanacaste to Escazú in an attempt to get more support from fans. Club president Percy Chamberlain kept Uruguayan manager Hernán Fernando Sosa, who had taken Guanacasteca to 4th place in the previous season, at the helm but he was eventually dismissed in September 2004 and replaced by compatriot Carlos Blanco on an interim basis and later Manuel Keosseián. By June 2005, the team had signed one of the best coaches from the 2004 tournament, Colombian coach Carlos Restrepo and they played in the National Stadium of Costa Rica. In September 2005, Chamberlain was replaced as president of the club by former Saprissa president Mínor Vargas and Restrepo was released from his managerial duties in May 2007 and club president Mínor Vargas replaced him with Mauricio Wright, who was a member of Costa Rica's 2002 World Cup national team.

Brujas F.C.
In summer 2007, the club moved again to play at the Estadio Jorge "Cuty" Monge in Desamparados and were renamed Brujas F.C. In December 2009 Brujas won the Invierno 2009 championship after beating Puntarenas in the final, which was the first to be decided on penalties in 38 years.

Wright was replaced by Luis Torres in May 2010 and in November 2010 club president Vargas resigned after it was claimed his company Grupo Ícono not only owned Brujas but also the then recently from the premier division expelled Barrio México. Vargas was arrested in the United States for alleged fraud with the PCI company in January 2011 and was found guilty to seven counts of fraud and three counts of money laundering in April 2012 and sentenced to 60 years in prison in October 2012.

In April 2011 the club's franchise was transferred to Orión, who continued to play at the Cuty Monge stadium, and acquired by Spaniard Juan Luis Hernández Fuertes. Hernández was later acquitted of charges pressed by the Vargas family over bad checks.

The club's supporters were known for using the now infamous phrase, Menores de lo que pensábamos (Smaller than we thought) as their official motto.

Honours

National
 Primera División de Costa Rica (1): Invierno 2009.

Championship Invierno 2009
List of players and coaching staff who won the Costa Rica First Division National Soccer Championship on December 28, 2009.

History 

In a long-awaited match for the Costa Rican soccer fans, because after the 1964 campaign in which the Carmen FC team defeated Club Sport Uruguay de Coronado, there have been no finals without one of the 3 biggest in this league , Liga Deportiva Alajuelense, Club Sport Herediano and Deportivo Saprissa.  The match began at 7:05 p.m. with an excited Buenos Aires team that went happily to the front but to no avail, because the first actions of real danger occurred until approximately 25 minutes later, and until 37 minutes when Luis Lara beat the defense but the ball crashed into the vertical.  In the second half the "shark" team got tired of wasting goals and the "sorcerers" went all out on the attack but there were no goals, the first leg final was very lackluster especially because Brujas FC was not the overwhelming team that it was before the Municipal Pérez Zeledon and Liberia Mía, everything is defined on Monday, December 28, 2009 at 2:00 p.m.

The return leg was played at the Jorge Hernán "Cuty" Monge Stadium in a hotly contested game that welcomed 5,500 people seated even in the yellow zones and perhaps a little more fans, and at least 150 more than They stayed outside the stadium.  The game was played too much in the first few minutes, so much so that Puntarenas FC took the lead in the 13th minute through Luis Lara, in a first half that did not leave much to talk about.

In the second half at minute 46' Daniel "naughty" Jiménez tied the game in a dressing room goal and would leave it that way until the end.  The team from Desamparadeño won on penalties 5-4 with the failure of Josimar Arias for Brujas FC and Mario Viquez together with Bryan Zamora for Puntarenas FC.  With this Brujas FC earned their first star on their shield, in other words their first national title.

Historical list of coaches

 Hernán Fernando Sosa (2004)
 Carlos Blanco (September 2004)
 Manuel Keosseián (September 2004 – March 2005) 
 Carlos Restrepo (June 2005 – May 2007)
 Mauricio Wright (May 2007 – May 2010)
 José Luis Torres Mora (May 2010 – April 2011)

References

Association football clubs established in 2004
Defunct football clubs in Costa Rica
2004 establishments in Costa Rica
Association football clubs disestablished in 2011